The Vacomagi were a people of ancient Britain, known only from a single mention of them by the geographer Ptolemy c. 150. From his general description and the approximate locations of their neighbors, their territory was the region roughly comprehending the old districts of Banffshire, Elginshire, Nairnshire, and the eastern portion of Inverness-shire. Ptolemy says that their towns or principal places were called 'Bannatia', 'Tamia', Pinnata Castra, and 'Tuesis'.

Etymology 
The origin of the name Vacomagi is uncertain. A possibility is that Vacomagi may come from the old British words vaco, a bay or firth, and magh, a plain. Hence, the people of the plain of the firth. Andrew Breeze's proposed etymological genesis from Brittonic *wocomiugi meaning "‘those who are strongly bound together" (> Welsh gogyfiaw) has been adjudged unlikely due to the number of textual amendments required.

References

Historical Celtic peoples
Picts
Tribes mentioned by Ptolemy